Smith/Kotzen is the self-titled debut album from rock musicians Adrian Smith and Richie Kotzen, released on 26 March 2021.

"Taking My Chances" was released as the first single from the album in December 2020. It was followed by "Scars" in February 2021, and "Running" in March.

Commercial performance
Smith/Kotzen placed at number five on the midweek UK Albums Chart dated 29 March 2021, eventually debuting at number 17 on the final chart dated 2 April 2021.

Track listing

Personnel
 Adrian Smith - guitars, vocals, bass (7-9)
 Richie Kotzen - guitars, vocals, bass (1-6), drums (1-5)
 Nicko McBrain - drums (6)
 Tal Bergman - drums (7-9)
 Produced by Richie Kotzen and Adrian Smith
 Mixed by Kevin Shirley

Charts

References

2021 debut albums
BMG Rights Management albums
Richie Kotzen albums